Darna Mana Hai (English: Fear is Forbidden) is a 2003 Indian Hindi-language anthology horror film. The film consists of six different short stories. It stars Nana Patekar, Vivek Oberoi, Aftab Shivdasani, Shilpa Shetty, Sameera Reddy, Isha Koppikar, Saif Ali Khan, Sohail Khan, among many others. Upon release it met with extremely negative response, despite that it was a cult classic movie. Later in 2006 Ram Gopal Varma, the producer, spawned Darna Zaroori Hai, a sequel with a different ensemble cast, six new cinematographers, seven different directors. Only Rajpal Yadav and director Prawaal Raman were back from the previous installment. Darna Mana Hai has been dubbed and released in Telugu with the same title.

Plot 

Darna Mana Hai interweaves six stories into one film. Seven friends get stuck in the middle of a forest when their car breaks down, and all of them except Vikas find refuge in an abandoned house. To keep each other amused, they tell each other horror and supernatural stories that they have heard over a bonfire.

Story 1 — On the Way 

The first story revolves around a married couple, Karan and Anjali, who get stuck in the middle of a forest. During the trip, Karan is constantly trying to scare Anjali by playing pranks. After their car suddenly stops, Karan gets out to investigate the problem. After his disappearance and his cry for help from the desolated forest, Anjali gets out and runs into the forest to rescue him. She finds Karan's torch covered in blood and is stalked by an unseen person or supernatural being. Panicking, Anjali runs around and finds a hand reaching out of a swamp. She then becomes terrified to find that the hand is wearing a watch identical to her husband's. After failed attempts to rescue him, the hand disappears. Someone creeps up on her and as Anjali screams, the person turns out to be Karan. Karan seems completely normal and fine, while Anjali, whimpering, attempts to tell him that she heard him screaming. However, Karan tells her that he heard her screams from the forest when he went to retrieve water. She looks at the torch that she found, which is suddenly clean of the blood that it was covered in. She then hurries back to the car with Karan, telling him to get them both out of there. After quickly fixing the car's problem with the water, Karan and the panicked Anjali climb into the car and drive off. After seeing Anjali's anxious and worried state, Karan puts his arm around her as she leans on him and closes her eyes. He then smirks and looks into the rearview mirror of the car, in which his reflection doesn't exist and Anjali is leaning on nothing (implying that he is a vampire).

After this story, one of the friends gets frightened and goes back to the car.

Story 2 — No Smoking 

The second story is about a photographer, Anil, who checks into an inn while on his way to Mumbai. The manager and owner of the lodge is an eccentric man who insists that smoking is strongly prohibited in his inn. When Anil tries to go outside for a smoke, the man prevents him, telling him about the diseases that come along with smoking. The owner then locks Anil inside the lodge and tells him that in a matter of six months, he can cure his addiction to smoking. He reveals that he had cured 70% of the people from smoking, while 30% had been murdered. The owner takes Anil to a basement and shows him piles of corpses, telling him that he tried to prevent them, but these people would not quit smoking. After six months, Anil is now working at the lodge, having succumbed to madness. When a client walks in smoking and asks him for a room, Anil tells him that smoking is strongly prohibited. The customer displays contempt, and Anil calmly shoots him dead. The story ends with Anil and the owner sitting together, enjoying the Tom and Jerry show airing on the television and watching a commercial about the effects of smoking.

After this story, a second friend in the group around the bonfire goes to the car looking for a blanket. When she leaves, the body of the first girl who left the bonfire is shown. The second girl is chased around the forest, caught and stabbed by an unseen assailant.

Story 3 — Homework 

The third story is that of a school teacher named Dayashankar Pandey. He confronts a student named Pramila, who is always punished for not completing her homework. One day, when Pandey asks Pramila to hold out her hand for punishment (assuming that she did not do her homework), Pramila produces her homework instead. However, her homework elicits a strange reaction from Pandey. Following this, the incident repeats itself everyday, making Pandey increasingly anxious. Upon a suggestion from a coworker that she might be receiving help from her parents or a tutor, Pandey calls upon Pramila's mother. She denies helping her daughter. He then asks about the Om sign that Pramila draws on every page of her homework. The mother shrugs it off, which forces Pandey to drop the topic. Later, Pandey decides to go to Pramila's house. He confronts Pramila's mother and tells her that he had an intelligent friend, Varun, who died when he fell off a building while flying kite with him (In reality, he had pushed Varun off the building in jealousy) and that he thinks Pramila is a reincarnation of his friend. He says that Varun used to draw the Om sign to prove it. He realizes that he is deranging and leaves apologizing. On the way back home, he is confronted by Varun's spirit, who warns him, "You are not insane yet. But you will be." By the following morning, Pandey loses his sanity, scribbling basic mathematics on the road.

After this story is told, another friend in the group leaves the bonfire, looking for the girls who had left them before. He reaches the car to discover Vikas killed by the knife that he had in his hand. When he attempts to go back to warn his friends, he is also confronted by the mysterious attacker.

Story 4 — Apples 

The fourth story focuses on a housewife named Gayatri. She goes to market and comes across a vendor, who is selling apples for Rs. 20 while everyone else is selling apples at Rs. 60. She buys the apples from the vendor, but his demeanour unsettles her. After returning home, she throws away the apples, but they inexplicably reappear inside the fridge. Gayatri's husband Sanjay eats one of the apples and finds it very tasty. She worries that something might happen to Sanjay after eating the apples, as she harbours suspicions about the vendor. The next morning, when Gayatri wakes up, she is shocked to find an apple next to her instead of her husband. She runs outside and is astonished to see apples everywhere on the ground, seemingly that every person who has eaten an apple has transformed into one. The vendor then appears with an evil look, offering Gayatri his last apple for free.

Story 5 — Ghostly Lift 

In the fifth story, an elderly man named John Rodrigues is standing at a graveyard. A young man in sunglasses, Amar, drives by and offers John a lift. Amar inquires about John's visit at the graveyard. From John's reply, he assumes that the former might be widowed and so he might have come to visit his wife's grave. However, John says that it is actually he who is dead. Amar dismisses it as a joke. As the conversation progresses, Amar is increasingly exasperated with John's creepy behaviour. Amar halts the car, gets out and demands John to leave. John confesses that he works for MTV Bakra (a program similar to Punk'd) and Amar is the first person not to get scared by his prank. Amar says that he was not scared because he knew beforehand that John was not a ghost. He says that he knew this because he himself is a ghost. John thinks that Amar is now trying to play a prank to get back at him, but Amar takes off his sunglasses, revealing his pitch black eyes, before suddenly vanishing. John dies upon witnessing this.

Back in real time, at the end of the fifth story, only two friends are left, as none of the five have returned. The two of them start talking about other things when a bespectacled youth suddenly appears, sitting at a corner. The strange man approaches the two and tells them that he has heard the five stories. He asks the boy out of the two friends to tell a story, who narrates the following.

Story 6 — Stop/Move 

The sixth and final story is about a young student, Purab, who has unrequited feelings for Abhilasha, but is frustrated for being a social pariah. Purab contemplates suicide but vents about not being special in front of an idol. Later, he discovers that he has developed an extraordinary ability – he can immobilize a particular person just by saying "Stop!" to them. Purab uses his ability to freeze Abhilasha, and later demonstrates it to her by immobilizing a number of students in their college. Abhilasha, frightened of Purab's power, agrees to date him. Thereafter, Purab returns home and thinks about megalomaniac fantasies. In his delusion, Purab accidentally immobilizes himself while looking at the mirror. His father finds him like that in his room, with a victorious smile frozen on his face. Purab is immediately rushed to the hospital, but in vain.

Ending 

The strange man tells the two friends that it is now his turn to tell a story. He tells them a story that they are partly familiar with.

A group of seven friends are travelling one night when their car breaks down. They seek shelter under a ruined shack and start telling stories to each other to kill time. After each story, one friend in the group (supposedly frightened) goes out into the forest and gets killed, one by one, until only two are left. The two friends that are left stop telling stories to each other and the killer, who is now bored, comes out to them. The killer appears to be the very same strange man that is narrating this story. He says that his only reason for the murders is because he cannot stand fear and would kill anyone who is scared.

The man then fatally stabs the boy. The girl, Shruti, runs into the forest as fast as she can, but the killer catches up to her and stabs her. She manages to bludgeon the man to death before fainting.

When day breaks, Shruti awakens and walks up to the main road to find that the place is swarming with policemen and her friends' corpses are being taken into ambulances. Then, she sees the killer sitting on a car. Shruti points at the man and tries to tell the police that he is the murderer, but the policemen completely ignore her. The killer then points at a body, which she shockingly discovers to be her own. She realizes that she too is dead and is now a ghost, and watches their corpses being taken away with tears in her eyes. As she watches, she is joined by the ghosts of her friends and the killer.

Cast 

 Nana Patekar as John Rodriguez
 Saif Ali Khan as Anil Manchandani
 Vivek Oberoi as Amar Vashisht
 Sanjay Kapoor as Sanjay Joshi, Gayatri's husband
 Sohail Khan as Karan Ahuja
 Shilpa Shetty as Gayatri Pandit
 Isha Koppikar as Abhilasha Malhotra
 Aftab Shivdasani as Purab Khandelwal
 Boman Irani as a hotel owner
 Sameera Reddy as Shruti Kapoor
 Gaurav Kapoor as Romi Yadav
 Antara Mali as Anjali Deshmukh, Karan's wife
 Raghuvir Yadav as Dayashankar Pandey (teacher)
 Anuj Pandit Sharma as Varun Goswami
 Revathi as Pramila's mother
 Rajpal Yadav as an apple vendor
 Sushant Singh as a serial killer
 Malavika as Neha Bhatia
 Rahul Singh as Dev Bohra
 Peeya Rai Chowdhary as Mehnaz
 Kiku Sharda as Amar Varma, friend of Shruti 
 Yusuf Hussain as Purav's Father

Box office and reception
The film was a flop at the box office. Even though the film was a commercial failure at the box office it was praised for Prawaal Raman's direction and the performance of the cast was also praised.

Soundtrack

The soundtrack features 6 songs composed by Salim–Sulaiman, with lyrics by Lalit Marathe.

Track listing:
"Darna Mana Hai" (4:20) –  Sunidhi Chauhan, Ninad Kamat, Naresh Kamat
"Darna Mana Hai Remix" (4:15) –  Sunidhi Chauhan, Ninad Kamat, Naresh Kamat
"Homework" (5:11) –  Clinton Cerejo, Aparna Jha, Vijay
"Jo Dar Gaya Voh Mar Gaya" (4:45) –  Sunidhi Chauhan, Salim Merchant, Naresh Kamat
"No Smoking" (4:56) –  Ravi Khote
"Stop" (4:27) –  Sonu Nigam, Sunidhi Chauhan

References

External links
 Darna Zaroori Hai (2006 Film)

Taran Adarsh's Movie Review on IndiaFm
ApunKaChoice's Movie Review

2003 films
2000s Hindi-language films
Indian anthology films
2003 horror films
Indian horror films
Indian horror anthology films
Indian supernatural horror films
Films shot in Mumbai
Films directed by Prawaal Raman